Russell Austin Lewis (March 26, 1895 – October 19, 1966) was an American football coach and educator.  He was the third head football coach at Abilene Christian University in Abilene, Texas and he held that position for the 1921 season. His coaching record at Abilene Christian was 2–5.

Head coaching record

References

External links
 

1895 births
1966 deaths
Abilene Christian Wildcats football coaches
Sportspeople from Tempe, Arizona